An ongoing outbreak of mpox, a viral disease then commonly known as "monkeypox", was confirmed in May 2022. The initial cluster of cases was found in the United Kingdom, where the first case was detected in London on 6 May 2022 in a patient with a recent travel history from Nigeria (where the disease is endemic). On 16 May, the UK Health Security Agency (UKHSA)  confirmed four new cases with no link to travel to a country where mpox is endemic. All four cases appeared to have been infected in London. From 18 May onwards, cases were reported from an increasing number of countries and regions, predominantly in Europe and in the Americas but also in Asia, in Africa, and in Oceania. The outbreak marks the first time mpox has spread widely outside Central and West Africa.
 

On 23 July, the Director-General of the World Health Organization (WHO), Tedros Adhanom Ghebreyesus, declared the outbreak a public health emergency of international concern (PHEIC). As of 18 March 2023, there had been a total of 86,516 confirmed cases in over 113 countries.

Mpox is a viral infection that manifests a week or two after exposure with fever and other non-specific symptoms, and then produces a rash with lesions that usually last for 2–4 weeks before drying up, crusting and falling off. While mpox can cause large numbers of lesions, in the current outbreak, some patients experience only a single lesion in the mouth or on the genitals, making it more difficult to differentiate from other infections. In infections before the current outbreak, 1–3 percent of people with known infections have died (without treatment). Cases in children and immunocompromised people are more likely to be severe.

Mpox spreads through close, personal, often skin-to-skin contact. The disease can spread through direct contact with rashes, or body fluids from an infected person, by touching objects and fabrics that have been used by someone with mpox or through respiratory secretions. Given the unexpected and vast geographical spread of the disease, the actual number of cases is likely to be underestimated. While anyone can get mpox, to date the majority of confirmed cases outside of the endemic regions in Africa occurred in young or middle-aged men who have sex with men (MSM) who had recent sexual contact with new or multiple partners. On 28 July, the WHO Director-General advised MSM to limit exposure by reducing the number of sexual partners, reconsidering sex with new partners, and maintaining contact details to allow for epidemiological follow-up. The Centers for Disease Control and Prevention has emphasized the importance of reducing stigma in communicating about the demographic aspects of mpox, specifically with regards to gay and bisexual men.

Background

Emergency preparedness 
On 17 March 2021, the Nuclear Threat Initiative led a tabletop exercise at the Munich Security Conference simulating hypothetical public health responses to the intentional release of a genetically manipulated strain of monkeypox virus.

On 23 July 2022, the World Health Organization Director-General Tedros Adhanom Ghebreyesus declared the 2022 outbreak a public health emergency of international concern.

Mpox in endemic Africa 
The Africa Centres for Disease Control and Prevention had alerted several members of the African Union in May 2022 about cases of mpox. The director of the Africa CDC, Ahmed Ogwell, said that Cameroon, Central African Republic, the Democratic Republic of Congo and Nigeria have reported 1,405 endemic cases with 62 deaths during the first five months of 2022. The case fatality rate in these four African countries combined was 4.4%.

In an article in The Conversation, Oyewale Tomori pointed out that the number of mpox infections in Nigeria through 2021 is likely to be under-reported because much of the Nigerian population has been avoiding healthcare facilities due to fear of contracting COVID-19. Nigeria's surveillance of various diseases, including mpox, had to focus on the global COVID-19 pandemic in 2020 and 2021, missing many cases and resulting in a drop in official statistics. As British health authorities reported the first case of mpox in the UK in May 2022, the Nigerian government has released to the public information and statistics on reported cases and deaths in the country. In the report of 9 May 2022, the NCDC stated that 230 cases were confirmed across 20 states and the Federal Capital Territory between 2017 and 2022. Rivers State was the most affected, followed by Bayelsa and Lagos. In the span from 2017 to 2022, the NCDC reported six deaths in six different states, making for a 3.3% case fatality ratio. On 30 May, the first death from mpox was reported in Nigeria during 2022; the last time a death was reported in the country from this disease was in 2019.

Outbreak characteristics 

Mpox is endemic to West and Central Africa. Prior to the 2022 outbreak, the United Kingdom had recorded only seven previous cases of mpox, all of which were imported cases from Africa or healthcare workers involved in their treatment. The first three such cases were in 2018, followed by a further case in 2019 and three more in 2021. The only major mpox outbreak to be recorded in a Western country prior to 2022 was the 2003 Midwest monkeypox outbreak in the United States, which did not feature community transmission.

Phylogenomic characterization of the first monkeypox virus outbreak genome sequences, found the "presumably slow-evolving" DNA virus has evolved roughly 6–12-fold more mutations than one would expect and 15 SNP mutations since the beginning of the outbreak.

The mpox incubation period is estimated to be 8.5 days on average and up to 21 days.

As of June 2022, ring-vaccinations and pre-exposure vaccination of MSM are strategies being advanced in some countries to contain the outbreak. Local transmission leading to sizeable clusters may have gone unnoticed for some time. Two vaccines are currently available. A short review suggests supportive care may typically be sufficient and that several antivirals and vaccinia immune globulin intravenous (VIGIV) are available as treatments. Better understanding of the new monkeypox virus variant is important for accelerating the development of vaccines and drugs.

The UK Human Animal Infections and Risk Surveillance (HAIRS) group warned that the virus could reach wildlife and become endemic as a result. There is a concern that if the ongoing outbreak is prolonged, it "could establish new ecological niches in wild animals" in regions outside of Africa.

Scientists are investigating circulating lineages (and potential variants) of the monkeypox virus and are comparing them against the African endemic lineages.

In July 2022, scientists reported that the window to be able to contain the outbreak is closing or has closed.

An analysis of studies by a journalist indicates that "about 10-to-15% of cases have been hospitalized, mostly for pain and bacterial infections that can occur as a result of mpox lesions". Studies published a month later, in August indicated hospitalizations of small cohorts of early patients were 8% and 13%.

Chronologically 
In the beginning of May 2022, a case of mpox in a British resident who had travelled to Lagos and Delta State in Nigeria, in areas where mpox is considered to be an endemic disease, was reported. The person developed a rash on 29 April while in Nigeria and flew back to the United Kingdom, arriving on 4 May, and presented to hospital later the same day. Mpox infection was immediately suspected, and the patient was hospitalised at a specialist clinical unit of the Guy's and St Thomas' NHS Foundation Trust and isolated, then tested positive for the virus on 6 May. Testing of patient swab samples by polymerase chain reaction revealed the outbreak to be of Clade II of monkeypox virus, which is the less deadly of the two known monkeypox virus variants with a case fatality rate of around 1%. The genomic sequence of the virus associated with this outbreak was first published on 19 May by Portuguese researchers.

Extensive contact tracing of people who had been in contact with the index case both on the international flight from Nigeria to the United Kingdom and within the country following their arrival was carried out, with potential contacts advised to remain aware of the symptoms of mpox and immediately isolate if any were to develop within 21 days of the contact event. Following this contact tracing effort, the World Health Organization (WHO) considered further transmission of the virus within the United Kingdom to be of "minimal" risk. Contact tracing was extended to Scotland on 14 May according to Public Health Scotland. A "small number" of people in Scotland were ordered to self-isolate following close contact with the person initially reported to have been infected, although overall risk to the general public remained "very low".

On 12 May two new cases of mpox were confirmed by the UK Health Security Agency (UKHSA), both in London, living together in the same household, with no known link between either of them and either the index case or travel to endemic regions. One of the new cases was hospitalised at St Mary's Hospital, while the other case with milder symptoms was said to be self-isolating at home. On 17 May, another four cases of mpox were confirmed by the UKHSA in three Londoners and a person in North East England who had previously travelled to London.

Unusually, none of these new cases had any known contact history with the previous three confirmed cases, which suggested a kind of transmission that had not been seen before, a wider community transmission of the virus in the London area. The UKHSA stated that the risk to the general public remained "very low". Patients with active mpox infection were confirmed to be hospitalised at the Royal Victoria Infirmary in Newcastle upon Tyne and at the Royal Free Hospital and Guy's Hospital in London.

Also on 20 May, UK Health Secretary Sajid Javid reported that another eleven cases had been confirmed, bringing the total in the country to twenty. UKHSA reported on 10 June that 311 of the 314 cases where sex was known were men, and that all of the 151 infected persons who filled out an additional questionnaire and answered questions about sexual practices were men who have sex with men, abbreviated MSM. Dr. Susan Hopkins from the UKHSA urged watchfulness among men who have sex with men. The UK Health Security Agency (UKHSA) advised people who have had close contact with a person infected with mpox to self-isolate for 21 days.

Further cases in multiple countries outside the endemic area were reported through the second half of May 2022. On 18 May, Portugal reported 14 cases of mpox. In Spain, there were seven confirmed cases as of 18 May. On the same day, the United States confirmed its first 2022 case of mpox and Canada reported 13 suspected cases.

On 19 May, Sweden, Belgium and Italy confirmed their first cases. On 20 May, Australia, Germany, France and the Netherlands confirmed their first cases. For the remainder of May, multiple European countries and Israel confirmed their first cases. The United Arab Emirates and Mexico also confirmed their first cases.

On 23 May, David Heymann, an advisor for the World Health Organization, said that the likely theory of how the outbreak started is transmission during sexual intercourse of gay and bisexual men at two raves in Belgium and Spain. On 25 May, The Guardian stated that many scientists suspect the disease was circulating across Europe before reaching the MSM community, possibly misdiagnosed or detected only in isolated cases; four cases were diagnosed in 2018 and 2019, all in individuals who recently arrived from Nigeria.

In addition to more common symptoms, such as fever, headache, swollen lymph nodes, and rashes or lesions, some patients have also experienced proctitis, an inflammation of the rectum lining. CDC has also warned clinicians to not rule out mpox in patients with sexually transmitted infections since there have been reports of co-infections with syphilis, gonorrhea, chlamydia, and herpes.

Deaths outside of endemic Africa
The first death outside of endemic Africa was reported in Brazil on 29 July 2022, in a 41-year-old man with underlying comorbidities. On the same day Spain reported its first death, a 44-year-old man in Alicante, with the cause of death being encephalitis associated with mpox infection. Spain reported its second mpox-related death on 30 July 2022, in a 31-year-old man in Córdoba, who had also suffered from encephalitis according to reports. On 1 August 2022 India confirmed its first mpox death, a 22-year-old male who died in Thrissur, Kerala on 30 July. On the same day, Peru reported the death of a mpox-affected 45-year-old male, who also had HIV and septic shock.

On 30 August 2022 a Texan from Harris County became the first American to die of the mpox epidemic.

Transmission 
A large portion of those infected had not recently travelled to areas of Africa where mpox is endemic, such as Nigeria, the Democratic Republic of the Congo as well as central and western Africa. It is transmitted by close contact with infected people, with extra caution for those individuals with lesions on their skin or genitals, along with their bedding and clothing. The disease can spread via respiratory secretions or by direct contact with rashes, body fluids or by touching objects and fabrics that have been used by someone with mpox. The CDC has also stated that individuals should avoid contact and consumption of dead animals such as rats, squirrels, monkeys and apes along with wild game or lotions derived from animals in Africa.

Transmission patterns
The 2022–2023 outbreak initially had a different pattern of spread compared to prior mpox outbreaks outside Africa.  Genetic evidence suggest the outbreak likely started in Nigeria. Given the unusually high frequency of human-to-human transmission observed in this event, and the probable community transmission without history of traveling to endemic areas, spread of the virus through close contact is more likely, with transmission during sexual activities being the most common route. Most cases have been in men. A significant proportion of cases, although not all, are in men who have sex with men (MSM), notably in Canada, Spain, and the UK, with many cases diagnosed in sexual health clinics. Cases are mostly in young and middle-aged men. This points to transmission due to close contact during sex as being the main route of transmission. In May 2022, the European Centre for Disease Prevention and Control (ECDC) considered the mpox virus to be moderately transmissible among humans. According to the centre, among MSM who contracted the virus, the most common means of transmission is likely through sexual activity due to intimate contact with infectious skin lesions. The ECDC rated likelihood of transmission due to close contact, including sexual contact, as "high", but, without close contact, as low. In Nature, Anne Rimoin and Raina MacIntyre speculate that the higher percentage of MSM affected is a result of coincidental introduction to the community and then sexual activity constituting "close contact" rather than the virus itself becoming sexually transmitted. However, in a study published in August 2022, infectious mpox virus was able to be isolated from semen samples, and the prolonged shedding of virus in seminal fluids raised the possibility of a genital reservoir for human mpox.

On 21 July, a study on a sample of 528 infections diagnosed between 27 April and 24 June outside endemic regions in Africa indicated that: 99% cases were in men; 98% of cases occurred in the community of men who have sex with men (MSM), mainly those who have multiple sex partners (median of 5 partners in the previous 3 months); 75% were white; 41% had HIV/AIDS, of which 96% were on antiretroviral therapy, while 57% of the persons who were not known to have HIV infection were on pre-exposure prophylaxis; 29% had another concomitant sexually transmitted infection; and in the previous month, 32% attended a sex on premises venue and 20% engaged in chemsex. 
On 2 August, data collected by the Joint ECDC-WHO Regional Office for Europe Mpox Surveillance indicated that 99% (15,439/15,572) of the cases reported throughout the European region were among males, with 44% among MSM, 1% among heterosexuals and another 55% in males whose sexual orientation is unknown. Among cases with known HIV status, 36% (2,690/7,487) were HIV-positive.

A preprint suggests that cases "where a small fraction of individuals have disproportionately large numbers of partners, can explain the sustained growth of mpox cases among the MSM population".

The reproduction number during the initial phase of the 2022 global outbreak of mpox was estimated to be 1.29.

As the mpox outbreak developed, nosocomial and other forms of human-to-human spread became apparent, with a notable example being a doctor in an Israeli hospital becoming infected probably while removing protective clothing after examining mpox patients. Contaminated surfaces within hospitals and households may be infectious, with widespread contamination of surface and air samples taken from mpox isolation rooms in UK hospitals being documented.

In August, the first known case of probable human-to-dog transmission was reported with the canine exhibiting very similar signs and symptoms of mpox infection to that of humans. There can be (rare) asymptomatic infections.

Wastewater surveillance 
A study from the Faculty of Medicine, Chulalongkorn University, reported multiple traces of monkeypox virus were detected in non-sewered wastewater with sparse sampling collected from both the Bangkok, Thailand with increasing concentrations from June to August 2022. This is the first dataset related to monkeypox viral DNA in wastewater in Bangkok. Monkeypox viral DNA was first detected in wastewater in the second week of June 2022. From the first week of July, the number of viral DNA copies increased. Sanger sequencing confirmed the identification of the monkeypox virus and its relation to the 2022–2023 mpox outbreak.

Vaccination 
Smallpox vaccines containing vaccinia such as Imvanex (Jynneos) and ACAM2000 can provide around 85% effectiveness against mpox. This protection level is calculated from studies using smallpox vaccines tested in late 1980 in Africa. According to the CDC the vaccination with Jynneos/Imvanex is "[a]dministered as two subcutaneous injections four weeks apart." while the vaccination with ACAM2000 is "administered as one percutaneous dose via multiple puncture technique with a bifurcated needle." However, ACAM2000 is not recommended for potentially immunocompromised persons due to high replication competency of vaccinia while Imvanex (Jynneos) is recommended for potentially immunocompromised persons due it containing an attenuated, non-replicating orthopoxvirus, Modified Vaccinia Ankara-Bavarian Nordic (MVA-BN). The UKHSA has begun using Imvanex as post-exposure prophylaxis for close contacts of known cases.

On 25 May, disease experts from the NICD in South Africa said they saw no need for mass vaccination, because they believe cases will not explode as they did in the COVID-19 pandemic.

In reaction to the current outbreak of mpox, a number of countries have stated they are buying vaccines and/or releasing vaccines from national stockpiles for use in the outbreak. In May 2022, the US, Spain, Germany and the UK all announced purchases of smallpox vaccine.

On 24 May, Centers for Disease Control (CDC) Deputy Director Jennifer McQuiston confirmed the United States is releasing some of their Jynneos vaccine supply from their Strategic National Stockpile for people who are "high-risk".

On 23 June, the New York City Department of Health announced a clinic at the Chelsea Sexual Health Clinic would offer the two-dose Jynneos vaccine to "...all gay, bisexual, and other men who have sex with men (cisgender or transgender) ages 18 and older who have had multiple or anonymous sex partners in the last 14 days." By July 27, the federal government had distributed 300,000 doses to state and local health authorities, with distribution at clinics nation-wide, and was planning to release 786,000 more that week.

Bavarian Nordic is the only manufacturer of Jynneos in the world, and its manufacturing facility closed in spring 2022 to be refitted to make vaccines for other diseases using the MVA-BN technology. The company projects Jynneos manufacturing will restart in 2023, except for 15 million doses that just need final "fill and finish" repackaging.
The United States helped fund the development of Jynneos, leading to concerns that existing contracts will lead to vaccine nationalism and hoarding, and prompting calls for allocating doses to lower-income countries via GAVI.

On 9 August, the FDA gave emergency use authorization for intradermal (rather than subcutaneous) mpox vaccination using a lower dose of Jynneos, which would increase the number of available doses up to five-fold. The vaccination would still be given in two doses, 28 days apart. A 2015 study had tested a regimen of one-fifth dose given intradermally.

Another mpox vaccine, the modern LC16m8 vaccine was developed in Japan as a national asset, and the manufacturer said it could not assist other countries.

Social aspects 
As of May 2022, public health authorities have aimed to target resources and education to affected groups, but avoid stigma which could discourage people with symptoms or who have been exposed from seeking help. LGBT rights groups have issued statements advising media to avoid stigmatising marginalised groups such as men who have sex with men. On 22 May, UNAIDS urged communicators to avoid stigma by taking an evidence-based approach, reiterated that the disease can affect anyone and that risk is by no means limited to men who have sex with men.

On 24 May, The Washington Post published an article that pointed out the lack of global attention to the disease when it only affected Africans, compared to the attention directed at it when a small number of cases started affecting Western countries. Some also objected to pictures used in media coverage of mild illnesses in Europe that featured severe cases in sub-Saharan Africans.

On 26 July, Owen Jones of The Guardian argued that the focus needs to be on testing, awareness and vaccination, that targeted health messages help protect as many people as possible from the virus, and that those most at risk should be protected without stigma, noting that some members of the LGBT community have already started to adjust behaviors to reduce risk.

On 30 July, Rod Dreher of The American Conservative criticized public health officials for not shutting down gay sex clubs in response to the outbreak. Similarly, many conservative commentators have accused public health officials of hypocrisy for implementing harsh restrictions on everyday life in response to the COVID-19 pandemic while not encouraging similar restrictions in response to mpox, such as shutting down sex parties and practicing abstinence. In response, public health officials have "reject[ed] comparisons to the early days of the coronavirus pandemic, when they mandated masks and shut down public spaces. They noted that the novel coronavirus was unfamiliar, far deadlier and airborne, with hospitals overrun with patients at various points over the past two years." and that "Monkeypox has known treatments and vaccines, although they have been challenging to access; it also has not killed anyone in the United States, and hospitalizations are uncommon."

An August survey by the CDC found that gay and bisexual men have significantly reduced sexual encounters in response to the mpox outbreak.

Misinformation 
Misinformation and conspiracy theories spread online in various social media networks. In an article published by the BBC in May 2022 countering misinformation about the mpox outbreak, journalist Rachel Schraer noted that social media accounts and news outlets from different countries including China, Russia, Ukraine and the United States have been promoting the idea that the outbreak was caused by a lab leak or that mpox is being used as a bioweapon. The Institute for Strategic Dialogue described this as "Reviving the spread of a set of cut-and-paste... conspiracies", referring to conspiracy theories used during the COVID-19 pandemic. The BBC also made it clear that the genetic sequences of the virus, as far as is known, date back to a West African strain.

Responses

World Health Organization 
On 20 May, the World Health Organization (WHO) convened an emergency meeting of independent advisers to discuss the outbreak and assess the threat level. Initial assessments expressed the expectation of the outbreak to be contained, and of low impact to the general population in affected countries. Its European chief, Hans Kluge, expressed concern that infections could accelerate in Europe as people gather for parties and festivals over the summer. On 1 June, a WHO statement acknowledged that undetected transmission had occurred for some time, and called for urgent action to reduce transmission. On 14 June, the WHO announced plans to rename disease from monkeypox to mpox to combat stigma and racism surrounding the disease. A meeting convened on 23 June determined that the outbreak did not constitute a public health emergency of international concern for the time being, but that decision was overturned by a later meeting on 23 July.

Countries 
: The Pasteur Institute of Algeria issued a communiqué in May, in which the Institute described the origins of mpox in Sub-Saharan Africa, and recommended physical distancing, as well as the use of masks in crowded or enclosed places, in addition to avoiding contact with wild animals that may possess the virus.
: On 28 July, Health Minister Anahit Avanesian told reporters that the country had not yet recorded any cases of mpox, but confirmed that the country had received test kits from Russia.
: On 28 July, the Chief Medical Officer of Australia declared the increasing presence of mpox "a communicable disease incident of national significance". On 4 August, the Health Minister announced the securing of 450,000 third-generation mpox vaccines.
: On 22 May, the Directorate General of Health Services (DGHS) issued warnings at every port in the country to prevent the spread of mpox. The Directorate spokesperson said that they have asked all air, land and sea ports to be alert. Suspected cases are instructed to be sent to an infectious disease hospital and kept in isolation. Bangladesh became the first country bar shore passes, after the Chittagong Seaport barred shore passes for all crew unless in the case of an emergency, while signed-off crew will have to undergo health checks.
: The Risk Assessment Group (RAG) and health authorities declared that those infected with mpox must self-isolate for 21 days.
: The Brazilian Ministry of Health created groups of biologists to monitor monkeys and medical groups to monitor possible cases. On August 8, 2022, during a podcast, the president of Brazil Jair Bolsonaro made homophobic jokes about the disease. When questioning the host about whether he would get a mpox vaccine, and the host says yes; Jair Bolsonaro replied: "I'm sure you want to get the vaccine. You don't fool me" followed by laughter. The host remains in his serious speech on the subject, Bolsonaro commented: "Don't you understand?" clarifying the homophobic tone of the comment.
: In June, the Ministry of Health advised the population of Botswana to go to the nearest hospital in case of any unusual symptoms. In addition, the ministry advised to avoid close contact with other people.
: In May, Or Vandine, spokeswoman for the Ministry of Health, alerted the citizens of Cambodia that mpox could be lethal due to the lesions caused by this disease, which can lead to complications in the body's organs. In June 2022, the Cambodian government ordered screening under the supervision of health workers of all air, sea and land entry points in the country, in addition to ordering mandatory quarantine of anyone infected or in contact with people with the disease.
: On 21 April, Public Services and Procurement Canada published a tender request seeking to stockpile doses of smallpox vaccine to be prepared in the event of a future accidental or intentional release of the virus. The contract for 500,000 doses closed on 5 May, and was awarded to Bavarian Nordic. On 24 May, the Public Health Agency of Canada stated that they were in the process of extracting Imvamune vaccines from their National Emergency Strategic Stockpile for deployment across the country, starting with the province of Quebec. On 26 May, Quebec announced that Imvamune vaccines would be made available to those who have been in close contact with confirmed or suspected mpox cases. On 7 June, PHAC announced that travellers returning to Canada may be subject to a mandatory quarantine period if they become ill with mpox, and warned that quarantined travellers may have restricted access to health care and delays returning home.
: On 2 June, the Chinese CDC issued a notice quoting WHO's document with a translation of the original "Stigmatising people because of a disease is never okay. Anyone can get or pass on monkeypox, regardless of their sexuality." On June 10, the General office of the National Health Commission of the People's Republic of China and the Office of the State Administration of Traditional Chinese Medicine issued the Guidelines for the Diagnosis and Treatment of Monkeypox (2022 Version). On July 25, after the declaration of mpox as a public health emergency of international concern by World Health Organization , the General Administration of Customs of the People's Republic of China issued the Announcement on Preventing Monkeypox from Spreading into China. In September 2022, the Chinese CDC's chief epidemiologist advised Chinese citizens to avoid "direct skin-to-skin contact with foreigners."
: As of May, the Colombian Ministry of Health was taking follow-up and control measures. The Director of Epidemiology and Demography of the Ministry of Health, Claudia Cuellar, informed the Colombian population about how mpox is spread through people, and she spoke about the clinical presentation of the virus and international health regulations. Health authorities in the Department of Norte de Santander have been on alert, since the department is a border area where people pass between Colombia and Venezuela.
: In May, the Ministry of Public Health of the Dominican Republic issued a preventive epidemiological alert after mpox was reported in several countries.
: On 24 May, the Egyptian Ministry of Health and Population informed about measures to prevent new mpox infections, among them, was to wash hands with soap or use an alcohol-based hand sanitiser, in addition to using personal protective equipment such as masks. In addition, the Ministry informed that veterinary quarantine procedures should be taken for animals that present the disease.
: The country's Centre for Disease Control and Border Health Protection Unit are monitoring the situation. The Ministry of Health has put in place infection prevention protocols at the border. Minister for Health Ifereimi Waqainabete said that the Ministry is on high alert after three suspected cases of mpox returned negative results.
: Fabian Leendertz of the Robert Koch Institute described the outbreak as an epidemic that would not last long: "The cases can be well isolated via contact tracing and there are also drugs and effective vaccines that can be used if necessary."
: On 26 May, the Minister of Health of Guatemala, Francisco Coma, informed that the Ministry declared an epidemiological alert on the borders of the Central American country, with the objective of detecting possible cases of mpox. The minister also mentioned that one of the main transmissions of mpox is from injuries and body fluids as well as contact with contaminated clothing.
: Union Health Minister Mansukh Mandaviya directed the National Centre for Disease Control and the ICMR to keep a close watch and monitor the situation. The Union Health Ministry has also directed airport and port health officers to be vigilant, according to official sources. They have been instructed to isolate and send samples to the National Institute of Virology of any sick passenger with a travel history to infected countries.
: When cases of mpox were reported in Australia in May 2022, they triggered the alert of health authorities in Indonesia. Mohammad Syahril, ministry spokesperson, urged medical personnel and the country's population to be alert and aware of the symptoms of the disease.
: The Health Service Executive (HSE) has set up a multidisciplinary incident management team to prepare for the possible arrival of mpox, and infectious diseases experts are on alert for patients with symptoms of the virus. On 26 July, the Government of Ireland confirmed the issuing of a vaccination for specific groups and to increase awareness.
: The Japanese health ministry confirmed its first case of mpox on 25 July 2022. It was detected from a man in his 30s residing in the Tokyo area.
: On 23 May, the Ministry of Health and the National Public Health Institute drafted a document of recommendations and measures to help prevent the spread of the disease. In a press statement, healthcare authorities have declared that the situation is being closely monitored.
: On 21 May, the Ministry of Health said that they were monitoring the situation with Europe. The National Infectious Diseases Department of the HLC and refrained from close contact activities until the infection has resolved.
: On 27 May, the Malaysian Ministry of Health reactivated the MySejahtera app to provide information and surveillance on mpox.
: In May, Mexican health authorities have posted notices in clinics and hospitals for the purpose of identifying suspected cases in the country. In addition, the Ministry of Health issued an epidemiological alert on 26 May 2022.
: In May, several regional directors of the Moroccan Ministry of Health are coordinating a surveillance system for mpox with the Directorate of Epidemiology and Disease Control to prevent cases of mpox from European countries from spreading to Morocco, according to the  newspaper. Due to the "Marhaba 2022" operation, an operation that aims to facilitate the travel of Moroccans living abroad by sea when they travel during the summer period, sanitary measures have already been put in place.
: The Netherlands started vaccinating people considered 'at risk' for mpox infection at the end of July 2022. This includes people on pre-exposure prophylaxis for HIV prevention.
: The director general of the NCDC, Ifedayo Adetifa, advised the Nigerian population to avoid eating bush meat to prevent new mpox infections, in addition to storing food properly to avoid being contaminated by rodents, as mpox is a viral zoonosis.
: Former health secretary Francisco Duque III said that the Philippines was intensifying its border control measures amid the threat of the mpox virus. The health department stated it is exploring potential sources of mpox vaccines and antivirals.
: On 21 May, the Saudi Ministry of Health stated that they are ready to monitor and investigate cases of mpox, if any occurs. They added that it also has an integrated preventive plan to deal with such cases if they appear, including identifying suspected and confirmed cases.
: Badara Ly of the Ministry of Health and Social Action, spoke about the creation of a contingency plan in Senegal during an online conference with the WHO in May, in addition the doctor alerted the health system and advised the creation of fact sheets on prevention methods and reinforcement of screening in border areas.
: On 26 May, the National Institute for Communicable Diseases (NICD) gave a communiqué on how the virus is transmitted, and the institute stated that the 2022 outbreak is the largest outbreak of mpox outside of endemic regions. In addition, the NICD affirmed that the virus mainly spreads in tropical forest areas in West and Central Africa.
: On 30 May, the Taiwan Centers for Disease Control officially listed mpox as a notifiable infectious disease, and on 23 June, mpox was officially upgraded to a second-class notifiable infectious disease, which means that confirmed cases must be notified within 24 hours, and if necessary, isolation treatment may be implemented in designated isolation treatment institutions.
: On 24 May, the Department of Disease Control (DDC) started screening all overseas passengers from Central African countries and other outbreak countries at international airports. On 26 May 2022, the DDC set up an emergency operations center to monitor the outbreak situation and plan for a possible outbreak in the kingdom. Anutin Charnvirakul, Minister of Public Health, said that the government is seeking a smallpox vaccine from the WHO to bolster the public's immunity in case of a viral outbreak. On 30 May, The local news reported the first case of mpox in the country. The patient was a passenger who was transiting from Europe to Australia via Bangkok. However, the patient's symptoms developed and were diagnosed in Australia. Multiple traces of mpox detected in non-sewered wastewater with sparse sampling from Bangkok Thailand.
: On 22 May, Education Secretary Nadhim Zahawi said "we're taking it very, very seriously" and that the UK government had already started purchasing smallpox vaccines. The Terrence Higgins Trust and British Association for Sexual Health and HIV (BASHH) expressed concern about the impact on sexual health services in the United Kingdom.
: On 22 May, President Joe Biden commented "they haven't told me the level of exposure yet but it is something that everybody should be concerned about". National security advisor Jake Sullivan told reporters the US has a vaccine that is relevant to treating mpox.  On 25 May, the CDC issued an alert for gay and bisexual men to be especially vigilant. In addition, the CDC placed its mpox travel alert at "Level 2", following reports of cases in Australia and several countries in Europe. Beginning 18 July, Sonic Healthcare USA started testing for mpox using CDC's orthopoxvirus test, which includes monkeypox virus at Sonic Reference Laboratory in Austin, Texas.
: On 24 May, Vietnam's Ministry of Health asked border localities to increase surveillance to detect possible cases of mpox.

Dependent territories 
: On 31 May, a Strategic Coordination Group met to discuss Gibraltar's state of preparedness in the eventuality that a case of mpox was confirmed in the territory amid the rapid rise of cases in the United Kingdom and Spain.

Cases per country and territory 

This is a table of confirmed and suspected mpox cases in countries and territories during 2022. Countries whose 2022 timeline precede the May 6 index case are shaded orange. The table does not include countries where suspected cases were reported but later discarded.

Timeline of first confirmed cases by country or territory

Timeline of suspected cases by country or territory 
Countries listed below had only suspected cases at the time of reporting. Some countries reported confirmed cases after reporting suspected cases (i.e. Greece, Morocco, Turkey, Ecuador, Peru). Countries listed several times reported suspected cases again after they discarded suspected cases before.

Timeline of first deaths by country or territory (in countries with initial 2022 detection from 6 May onwards)

References

External links 

 Monkeypox outbreak – by the World Health Organization
 2022 Mpox Outbreak Global Map – CDC
 Monkeypox Meter – nice graphs and maps, but no source/reference links
 Monkeypox Tracker by BNO News ("This tracker is no longer being updated. The final update was on 11 June 2022.")
 Monkeypox_Public_www.global.health, a case-tracking spreadsheet maintained by the nonprofit Global.Health

 
2022–2023 outbreak
2022 disease outbreaks
2023 disease outbreaks
2022 in LGBT history
21st-century epidemics
May 2022 events
July 2022 events
June 2022 events
August 2022 events
Public health emergencies of international concern